is a Japanese manga series written by Yasutaka Fujimi and illustrated by REDICE and later by Shu Hirose. It was published online on Akita Shoten's Champion Cross web platform from October 2014 to May 2018, and on Manga Cross from December 2018 to March 2019. A sequel, titled Die! The Island of Giant Insects, began on Manga Cross in April 2019. A prologue original animation DVD (OAD) adaptation produced by Passione was released in June 2019 and a film adaptation premiered in January 2020.

Plot
After a plane crash during a field trip, a group of surviving classmates are stranded on an island filled with giant insects.

Characters

Media

Manga
The Island of Giant Insects is written by Yasutaka Fujimi, and first illustrated by the duo REDICE and later by Shu Hirose. It was serialized on Akita Shoten's Champion Cross web platform from October 21, 2014 to May 1, 2018. It was published on Manga Cross from December 27, 2018 to March 14, 2019, with an extra chapter published on March 28 of the same year. Akita Shoten collected its chapters in six tankōbon volumes, released from March 6, 2015 to June 20, 2019. A sequel, titled , began on Manga Cross on April 25, 2019. Akita Shoten released the first tankōbon volume on December 20, 2019. As of February 19, 2021, four volumes have been released.

Anime
An original animation DVD (OAD) adaptation produced by Passione was bundled with the manga's sixth volume, released on June 20, 2019. It was directed by Takeo Takahashi and Naoyuki Tatsuwa, written by Shigeru Morita, and features character designs by Takayuki Noguchi. It serves as a prologue to the film. The OAD aired in Japan on AT-X on December 1, 2019. An anime film adaptation by the same staff from the OAD premiered on January 10, 2020. A live-action film promotional video was launched for the film. It was co-produced by Crunchyroll. A Kickstarter campaign was launched for an English dub of the film.

Notes

References

External links
 
 

Akita Shoten manga
Crunchyroll anime
Horror anime and manga
Insects in popular culture
Japanese animated horror films
Japanese webcomics
OVAs based on manga
Passione (company)
Seinen manga
Survival anime and manga
Webcomics in print